Football was contested for men only at the 1982 Central American and Caribbean Games in Havana, Cuba.

Group stage

Group A

Group B

Semifinals

Bronze medal match

Gold medal match

References
 

1982 Central American and Caribbean Games
1982